RAF Stansted Mountfitchet was a Royal Air Force station during the Second World War located near the village of Stansted Mountfitchet in the District of Uttlesford in Essex,  north-east of central London. The airfield is now London Stansted Airport.

History

Second World War
Construction work began in August 1942 by US Engineers of the 817th Battalion. The site was used by the Royal Air Force and the United States Army Air Forces as a bomber airfield and as a major maintenance depot. Although the official name was Stansted Mountfitchet, the base was known as simply Stansted in both written and spoken form.

344th Bombardment Group
Stansted was officially opened on 7 August 1943 when the 30th Air Depot Group took up residence.  The airfield was officially transferred to the Ninth Air Force on 16 October. The 344th Bombardment Group arrived at Stansted on 8 February 1944, from Hunter Army Airfield in Georgia, US, flying the twin-engine B-26 Marauder. Its operational squadrons and fuselage codes were 494th (K9), 495th (Y5), 496th (N3), and 497th (7I). On 30 September the 344th moved to their Advanced Landing Ground at Cormeilles-en-Vexin, France.

2nd Tactical Air Depot
As well as an operational bomber base, Stansted airfield was a maintenance and supply depot concerned with major overhauls and modification of B-26s. After D-Day these activities were transferred to France, but the base was still used as a supply storage area for the support of aircraft on the continent.

Postwar use
After the withdrawal of the Americans on 12 August 1945, Stansted was taken over by the Air Ministry and used by No. 263 Maintenance Unit, RAF for storage purposes. In addition, between March 1946 and August 1947, Stansted was used for housing German prisoners of war. The Ministry of Civil Aviation finally took control of Stansted in 1949, but the US military returned in 1954 to extend the runway for a possible transfer to NATO. The transfer to NATO was never realised, however, and the airport returned to civil use in 1957, ending up under BAA control in 1966.

References

Bibliography

External links

Stansted Mountfichet
Airfields of the 9th Bombardment Division in the United Kingdom
Royal Air Force stations of World War II in the United Kingdom
RAF Stansted Mountfitchet